Gary Lemon (born April 16, 1961) is an American former professional tennis player.

A right-handed player from Los Angeles, Lemon played college tennis for the University of Tennessee and the University of Southern California, after which he competed briefly on the professional tour.

Lemon reached a best singles ranking of 263 in the world, with his best performance a second round appearance at the 1985 Japan Open.

References

External links
 
 

1961 births
Living people
American male tennis players
Tennis players from Los Angeles
Tennessee Volunteers men's tennis players
USC Trojans men's tennis players